Ikarbus IK-206 is an articulated city bus built by the Serbian  bus manufacturer Ikarbus from 2006.

The model IK-206 was developed from previous Ikarbus city articulated models, Ikarbus IK-201 and its variants, IK-202 and IK-203. The production has started in 2006 and same year the production of older IK-201, IK-202, and IK-203 models has been ceased. The main difference between those three models and new IK-206 is that IK-201, IK-202 and IK-203 had horizontal engine mounted under the floor between the front and middle A- and B-axles, and only the B-axle is powered, while IK-206 has rear-mounted vertical MAN engine. IK-206 is visually similar to older IK-201, IK-203 and IK-203, due it has modernized and more comfortable interior design, modern windows and front bezel headlights.

It has 44 passenger seats made plastic on foundation of steel bars and bars for holding. Doors are four two-wing, pneumatically controlled and opened to the inside. There are seven windows with slide rule and four roof airshafts. The heating system consists from heater on front wall, three heaters in passengers compartment and big aircondition on roof. Roof and sides are isolated.

The IK-206 is today used mainly by Lasta Beograd, Lastra Lazarevac and Sarajevo public transport (GRAS). It was not introduced in service with GSP Beograd, due to the decision of the city to buy only low-flor new buses.

Technical data 

Maximum speed - 72 km/h
Number of passengers - 160
Weight of empty vehicle - 14100 kg
Battery - 2 x 12V / 180 Ah
Tank volume - 300 l
Suspension - Air with telescopic shock-absorbers and torsion stabilizer
Steering-wheel - PPT (ZF) / 8045

Dimension 
Length - 17.99 m
Width - 2.5 m
Height - 3.3 m
Height inside - 2.26 m
Height of floor from the ground - 0.75 m
Height of lowest stair from the ground - 0.345 m
Distance between front axles - 5.65 m
Distance between rear axles - 6.045 m
Front end to the front wheels - 2.82 m
Rear end to the rear wheels - 3.482 m

Engines 
Installed in rear part vertical
MAN D2066 LUH 11 (E4)

Transmission 
Voith 864.5 automatic

See also 

 List of buses

References

External links
IK-206 (Serbian)

Ikarbus buses
Vehicles introduced in 2006